Ferrimonas gelatinilytica is a Gram-negative, facultatively anaerobic and motile bacterium from the genus of Ferrimonas which has been isolated from tidal flat sediments from the Yellow Sea in Korea.

References

External links
Type strain of Ferrimonas gelatinilytica at BacDive -  the Bacterial Diversity Metadatabase

Bacteria described in 2013
Alteromonadales